La máscara del ángel is a Mexican telenovela production produced by Televisa for Telesistema Mexicano in 1964.

Cast 
 María Rivas
 Guillermo Murray
 Patricia Morán
 Fernando Mendoza
 Jorge Mondragón
 Maruja Grifell

References

External links 

Mexican telenovelas
1964 telenovelas
Televisa telenovelas
1964 Mexican television series debuts
1964 Mexican television series endings
Spanish-language telenovelas